Jinny Ng is a Cantopop singer-songwriter in Hong Kong. She debuted in 2010 with her release, Love Diary.

Music Awards

IFPI Hong Kong Sales Awards

RTHK Top 10 Gold Songs Awards
The RTHK Top 10 Gold Songs Awards Ceremony(:zh:十大中文金曲頒獎音樂會) is held annually in Hong Kong since 1978.  The awards are determined by Radio and Television Hong Kong based on the work of all Asian artists (mostly cantopop) for the previous year.

Metro Showbiz Hit Awards

The Metro Showbiz Hit Awards (新城勁爆頒獎禮) is held in Hong Kong annually by Metro Showbiz radio station.  It focus mostly in cantopop music.

Metro Radio Mandarin Music Awards
It was first awarded in 2002 and ended in 2015.

Jade Solid Gold Best 10 Awards Presentation

Jade Solid Gold Songs Selections

TV Awards Presentation
It is organized by TVB.

TVB Star Awards Malaysia

StarHub TVB Awards

Yahoo! Asia Buzz Awards

"King of Music" Global Chinese Music Awards

Metro Children's Song Awards Presentation
It is first founded in 2005 by Metro Radio, it was the second ceremony for children's songs. It has been suspended since 2015.

TVB8 Mandarin Music On Demand Awards Presentation
It has suspended since 2016.

Music Pioneer Chart

Global Chinese Song Chart

uChannel Music Awards

Sprite Music Chart Awards

Chinese Music Festival Awards

Other Awards

Host

TVB Star Awards Malaysia

StarHub TVB Awards

References

Jinny Ng